Gülşehir, formerly Aravissos and Arapsun, ancient Zoropassos (Ancient Greek: Ζωρόπασος), is a town and district of Nevşehir Province in the Central Anatolia region of Turkey, in the vicinity of the Fairy Chimney valley of Göreme. According to 2010 census, population of the district is 24,503 of which 8,866 live in the town of Gülşehir, and the remainder in surrounding villages.

History
The old name of Gülşehir, situated on the southern bank of the Kızıl River, 20 km from Nevşehir, is Arapsun and in ancient times it was called “Zoropassos” by the Hittites. In the vicinity of Gülşehir there are still rocks and steles with inscriptions from the Hittites.

The Ottoman Grand Vizier Karavezir Mehmet Seyyid Pasha did the same thing in Gülşehir as Damat İbrahim Pasha did in the nearby Nevşehir and a külliye was built in the town which had only 30 houses. The complex consisted of a mosque, a madrasah and a fountain.

According to the Ottoman General Census of 1881/82-1893, the kaza of Gülşehir had a total population of 14.984, consisting of 11.029 Muslims, 3.935 Greeks and 20 Armenians.

The pottery, located completely inside an artificial cave deep in the rock, is a local tourist attraction.

Villages and towns 
Villages and towns in the district:

 Abuuşağı
 Alemli
 Alkan
 Bölükören
 Civelek
 Dadağ
 Eğrikuyu
 Emmiler
 Eskiyaylacık
 Fakuşağı
 Gökçetoprak
 Gülpınar
 Gümüşkent
 Gümüşyazı
 Hacıhalilli
 Hacılar
 Hamzalı
 Karacaşar
 Karahüyük
 Kızılkaya
 Oğulkaya
 Ovaören
 Şahinler
 Terlemez
 Tuzköy
 Yakatarla
 Yalıntaş
 Yamalı
 Yeniyaylacık
 Yeşilli
 Yeşilöz
 Yeşilyurt
 Yüksekli

See also
 Cappadocia
 Cappadocian Greeks
 Saint John's Church, Gülşehir
 St. Theodore Church also known as Üzümlü Kilise in Derinkuyu
 St. Demetrius Church
 Gülşehir Salt Mine
 Gülşehir Barajı (Dam)
 Yalıntaş Pond (Göleti)

Notes

References

External links

 A detailed website about Gülşehir 
 District governor's official website 
 Map of Gülşehir district 
 Administrative map of Gülşehir district 

Towns in Turkey
Cappadocia
Populated places in Nevşehir Province
Districts of Nevşehir Province